The Cheviot Hills, or sometimes The Cheviots, are a range of uplands straddling the Anglo-Scottish border between Northumberland and the Scottish Borders. The English section is within the Northumberland National Park.  The range includes The Cheviot (the highest hill), plus Hedgehope Hill to the east, Windy Gyle to the west, and Cushat Law and Bloodybush Edge to the south.

The hills are sometimes considered a part of the Southern Uplands of Scotland as they adjoin the uplands to the north. Since the Pennine Way runs through the region, the hills are also considered a part of the northern Pennines although they are separated from the Cheviot Hills by the Tyne Gap, part of which lies within the southern extent of the Northumberland National Park.

The Cheviot Hills are primarily associated with geological activity from approximately 480 to 360 million years ago, when the continents of Avalonia and Laurentia collided, resulting in extensive volcanic activity (the Caledonian orogeny) which created a granite outcrop surrounded by lava flows.

The area enjoys a general right to roam under both the English Countryside and Rights of Way Act 2000 and the Scottish Land Reform (Scotland) Act 2003.

The Southern Cheviots include the Otterburn Training Area, the UK's largest firing range, where the Ministry of Defence train up to 30,000 soldiers a year.

Description 
Other notable tops are Hedgehope Hill, Windy Gyle, Cushat Law and Bloodybush Edge. Of the hills mentioned, only Windy Gyle has its summit on the border. The rest are all within England. The English section is protected within the Northumberland National Park.

Although many of the summits top , most have a relatively low prominence. Only three rise  or more above the surrounding terrain: The Cheviot itself, Shillhope Law and Housedon Hill, a small northern outlier (see Marilyn).  To the south-west the Cheviots merge into the Kielder Forest group of hills.

There is a broad split between the northern and the southern Cheviots. The former encompass most of the high ground and are pierced by five main valleys:

 College Valley
 Harthope
 Breamish
 Bowmont
 Heatherhope valley

The southern Cheviot hills encompass the slopes running down to the valley of the river Coquet.

Geology 

At the centre of the range is an outcrop of Early Devonian granite, the Cheviot Pluton, which is surrounded by Silurian and Devonian arc andesitic lava flows, tuffs and agglomerates of the Cheviot Volcanic Formation. These are in turn intruded by a swarm of igneous dykes with a predominantly calc-alkaline chemistry arranged radially around the pluton. Both the pluton and the volcanic rocks owe their origin to the northward subduction of the oceanic crust attached to the former micro-continent of Avalonia beneath the Laurentian plate in the course of the Caledonian orogeny during the Ordovician and Silurian periods.

The surrounding lower ground is formed from Carboniferous Limestone, though much of it is obscured by superficial deposits of Quaternary age.

History 

To the south of the Cheviot hills was the site of the Battle of Otterburn in 1388, and possibly to a separate bloody battle between English and Scottish forces, after which only 110 people survived, which is described in "The Ballad of Chevy Chase". (Note – the origin of the border skirmishes between Percy, the Earl of Northumberland, and the Scottish Earl of Douglas, may have been a hunt that strayed into Scotland and was interpreted as an invasion.) Two other related battles were the Battle of Homildon Hill, fought within the Cheviots near Wooler in 1402, and the Battle of Hedgeley Moor, fought north of Powburn in 1464.

Access 
Most of the range on the English side is mapped as 'open country' and hence there is a general right to roam over it as prescribed in the Countryside and Rights of Way Act 2000. Traditional rights of access in Scotland, bolstered by the Land Reform (Scotland) Act 2003, provide for similar access for the public to the north of the border. In addition, a sparse network of public bridleways and footpaths stretches around the area, often providing useful means of access from the lower ground onto the open hills.

The northernmost leg of the Pennine Way runs from Byrness in England to Kirk Yetholm in Scotland. It is the longest, and most exposed, on the whole of the national trail. The Way follows the high level Border Ridge (literally the England–Scotland boundary fence) for nearly  after the ascent to the ridge from Byrness. The terrain is boggy and remote, and two mountain refuge huts are situated on the Way for those too tired or weather-beaten to continue.

The town of Wooler in the Cheviot Fringe (the lowlands bordering the hills to the east) is often cited as the "Gateway to the Cheviots" as it is the largest town in the Cheviot region; the town also has easy access being on the major A697 road.

Many walking routes have been established, such as:

 Breamish Valley Hillfort Trail 
 Three Forts Foray, a 5.5 mile walk that takes roughly 3.5 hours to complete. The walking difficulty has been graded as moderate.
 Humbleton Hillfort
 Ring Chesters Round
 Hethas Hike
 Hethpool to the Curr, a 11.5 mile walk that takes roughly 7 hours to complete. Graded as strenuous.
 Barrowburn Family Walk
 Harthope Valley Walk
 Yeavering Bell Walk
 Hethpool Wild Goat Walk
 Linhope Spout Walk
 Hethpool Linn and Yeavering Bell Walk
 Kirknewton Hillfort Trail
 Dunsdale to West Hill
 College Valley Walk
 The Shepherds Cairn Walk
 Reaveley Farn Family Stroll.

Otterburn Army Training Estate 

It is owned by the Ministry of Defence (MoD), and used for training some 30,000 soldiers a year. Otterburn is the UK's largest firing range, and is in frequent use — artillery can be clearly heard from Lindisfarne to the north-east and Fontburn Reservoir in the south. Because of this, recreational use of the area is restricted, although it is possible for the public to use some parts of the estate subject to the relevant bylaws. The MoD publishes a booklet, Walks on Ministry of Defence Lands, which offers advice on this matter (see link below).

Peaks over 500 metres in the Cheviot Hills 
The peaks marked with a warning sign lie within the danger area of the ATE Otterburn artillery range.

References

External links 
 Walking guides on the Defence Estate, including Otterburn – Ministry of Defence